Posterior superior alveolar may refer to:
 Posterior superior alveolar nerve
 Posterior superior alveolar artery